Trap Door is an EP by T Bone Burnett, released in 1982. It was his first release on the Warner Bros. label after leaving Takoma Records.

Although the EP is out of print, all the songs were reissued on CD by Rhino Handmade on March 27, 2007. The double CD also includes the Behind the Trap Door EP and Proof Through the Night, and was issued in a numbered limited edition of 5,000.

Reception

In his review, music critic Brett Hartenbach of AllMusic called the EP "Intelligent and compelling... well worth hunting down."

Track listing 
All tracks composed by T Bone Burnett; except where indicated.

 "Hold on Tight"	  
 "Diamonds Are a Girl's Best Friend" (Jule Styne, Leo Robin)
 "I Wish You Could Have Seen Her Dance"
 "A Ridiculous Man"
 "Poetry"
 "Trap Door"

Personnel
T Bone Burnett – vocals, guitar
David Kemper – drums
David Mansfield – guitar
David Miner – bass
Mark Saffan – vocals 
Charles Duncan – vocals 
Tommy Funderburk – vocals 
Steven Soles – vocals 
Billy Swan – vocals

Production
Produced by Reggie Fisher and T Bone Burnett
Mixed and engineered by Reggie Fisher and Geoff Gillette
Mastered by Bernie Grunman

References

T Bone Burnett albums
1982 debut EPs
Warner Records EPs